Sundari may refer to:

Media 
 Sundari (newspaper), a Tamil language newspaper in Sri Lanka 
 Sundari (Bengali TV series), a Bengali-language television drama
 Sundari (Kannada TV series), a Kannada-language television drama
 Sundari (Tamil TV series), a Tamil-language television drama
 Sundari (Malayalam TV series), a Malayalam-language television drama

People 
 Mata Sundari, a Sikh religious leader and spouse of Guru Gobind Singh
 Sundari Nanda (half-sister of Buddha), known as simply Sundari

Other 
 Sundari (instrument), a double reed wind instrument
 Tripura Sundari, a Hindu deity also known as Lalita

See also